Beta 2 Limited was a privately held Forex and precious metal trading business located in the City Of London. It went into liquidation in May 2016. Its managing director was Lane Clark. Founded in November 2007 the company was registered by the Financial Services Authority, FSA reg No. 529092, permitting them to arrange and advise on investments other than Pension Transfers and Pension Opt Outs.

Founded during the credit crunch of 2007 the company also experienced the flash crash  of 2010.

In January 2011 the company relocated its city offices to Broadgate Tower where it offered services to private individuals as well as corporations and investment funds.

References

External links 
 Financial Services Authority 

Foreign exchange companies
Companies based in the City of London